A wooden bicycle is a bicycle constructed either mostly, or entirely from wood. Wood was the material used in the earliest bicycles, and is also used by modern builders, especially in balance bicycles for children. The wood can be either solid or laminate.

History
The first bicycles recorded, known variously as velocipedes, dandy horses, or hobby horses, were constructed from wood, starting in 1817.

Modern
Recent technological advances in adhesives and fabrication have made wood a feasible choice in the modern cycle world.

Wooden bicycle frames are sometimes aided by steel or composite lugs to connect the wooden tubes or attach components. These frames can be made with plywood, hardwoods, or bamboo.

HTech Bikes make Wooden bicycles.

See also 
 Bamboo bicycle
 Cardboard bicycle
 Chukudu wood bicycle
 SplinterBike

References 

Wood
Bicycles